Dr. Anandibai Gopalrao Joshi (31 March 1865 – 26 February 1887) was the first Indian female doctor of western medicine. She was the first woman from the erstwhile Bombay presidency of India to study and graduate with a two-year degree in western medicine in the United States. She was also referred to as Anandibai Joshi and Anandi Gopal Joshi (where Gopal came from Gopalrao, her husband's first name).

Early life
Originally named Yamuna, Joshi was born, raised in a Marathi Chitpavan Brahmin family As was the practice at that time and due to pressure from her mother, she was married at the age of nine to Gopalrao Joshi, a widower almost twenty years her senior. After marriage, Yamuna's husband renamed her 'Anandi'. Gopalrao Joshi worked as a postal clerk in Kalyan. Later, he was transferred to Alibag, and then, finally, to Kolhapoor (Kolhapur). He was a progressive thinker, and, unusually for that time, supported education for women. She was also a relative of Pandita Ramabai.

At the age of fourteen, Anandibai gave birth to a boy, but the child lived only for a total of ten days due to lack of medical care. This proved to be a turning point in Anandi's life and inspired her to become a physician. After Gopalrao tried to enroll her in missionary schools and not working out, they moved to Calcutta. There she learned to read and speak Sanskrit and English.

Academic life

Her husband encouraged her to study medicine. In 1880 he sent a letter to Royal Wilder, a well-known American missionary, stating his wife's interest in inquiring about a suitable post in the US for herself. Wilder published the correspondence in his Princeton's Missionary Review. Theodicia Carpenter, a resident of Roselle, New Jersey, happened to read it while waiting to see her dentist. Impressed by both Anandibai's desire to study medicine, and Gopalrao's support for his wife, she wrote to Anandibai. Carpenter and Anandibai developed a close friendship and came to refer to each other as "aunt" and "niece." Later, Carpenter would host Anandibai in Rochelle during Joshi's stay in the U.S.

While the Joshi couple was in Calcutta, Anandibai's health was declining. She suffered from weakness, constant headaches, occasional fever, and sometimes breathlessness. Theodicia sent her medicines from America, without results. In 1883, Gopalrao was transferred to Serampore, and he decided to send Anandibai by herself to America for her medical studies despite her poor health. Though apprehensive, Gopalrao convinced her to set an example for other women by pursuing higher education.

A physician couple named Thorborn suggested that Anandibai apply to the Woman's Medical College of Pennsylvania. On learning of Anandibai's plans to pursue higher education in the West, orthodox Indian society censured her very strongly.

Anandibai addressed the community at Serampore College Hall, explaining her decision to go to America and obtain a medical degree. She discussed the persecution she and her husband had endured. She stressed the need for female doctors in India, emphasizing that Hindu women could better serve as physicians to Hindu women. Her speech received publicity, and financial contributions started pouring in from all over India.

Married life 

In the 1800s, it was very unusual for husbands to focus on their wives' education. Gopalrao was obsessed with the idea of Anandibai's education and wanted her to learn medicine and create her own identity in the world. One day, he came into the kitchen and found her cooking with her grandmother and proceeded to go into a raging fit. It was very uncommon for husbands to beat their wives for cooking instead of reading. As Gopalrao's obsession with Joshi's education grew, he sent her with Mrs Carpenter, a Philadelphian missionary, to America to study medicine. Before her voyage, she addressed a public hall in 1883. She addressed the lack of women doctors and said "I volunteer myself as one." She also mentioned how midwifery was not sufficient in any case and that instructors who teach these classes have conservative views. Gopalrao eventually moved to America when he felt displeased by her efforts. By the time he arrived in Philadelphia, she had completed her studies and was a doctor.

In the United States

Anandibai travelled to New York from Kolkata (Calcutta) by ship, chaperoned by two female English missionary acquaintances of the Thorborns. In New York, Theodicia Carpenter received her in June 1883. Anandibai wrote to the Woman's Medical College of Pennsylvania in Philadelphia, asking to be admitted to their medical program, which was the second women's medical program in the world. Rachel Bodley, the dean of the college, enrolled her.

Anandibai began her medical training at age 19. In America, her health worsened because of the cold weather and unfamiliar diet. She contracted tuberculosis. Nevertheless, she graduated with an MD in March 1886; the topic of her thesis was "Obstetrics among the Aryan Hindus." The thesis utilized references from both Ayurvedic texts and American medical textbooks. On her graduation, Queen Victoria sent her a congratulatory message.

Return to India
In late 1886, Anandibai returned to India, receiving a grand welcome. The princely state of Kolhapur appointed her as the physician-in-charge of the female ward of the local Albert Edward Hospital.

Death 
Anandibai died of tuberculosis early the next year on 26 February 1887 before turning 22 in Pune. Years preceding her death, she was fatigued and felt constant weaknesses. Medicine was sent to her from America but there were no results so she kept studying medicine until death. Her death was mourned throughout India. Her ashes were sent to Theodicia Carpenter, who placed them in her family cemetery at the Poughkeepsie Rural Cemetery in Poughkeepsie, New York. The inscription states that Anandi Joshi was a Hindu Brahmin girl, the first Indian woman to receive education abroad and to obtain a medical degree.

Despite practicing medicine for only two to three months, she rose to fame for her sheer determination and hardwork, to become the first Indian female to study western medicine, becoming an inspiration to all others who came after her.

Legacy 
In 1888, American feminist writer Caroline Wells Healey Dall wrote Joshi's biography. Dall was acquainted with Joshi and admired her greatly. However, certain points in the biography, particularly its harsh treatment of Gopalrao Joshi, sparked controversy among Joshi's friends.

Doordarshan, an Indian public service broadcaster aired a Hindi series based on her life, called "Anandi Gopal" and directed by Kamlakar Sarang. Shrikrishna Janardan Joshi wrote a fictionalised account of her life in his Marathi novel Anandi Gopal, which was adapted into a play of the same name by Ram G. Joglekar.

Dr. Anjali Kirtane has extensively researched the life of Dr. Anandibai Joshi and has written a Marathi book entitled "डॉ. आनंदीबाई जोशी काळ आणि कर्तृत्व" ("Dr. Anandibai Joshi, Kaal ani Kartutva: Dr. Anandibai Joshi, her times and accomplishments") which contains rare photographs of Dr. Anandibai Joshi.

The Institute for Research and Documentation in Social Sciences (IRDS), a non-governmental organization from Lucknow, has been awarding the Anandibai Joshi Award for Medicine in honour of her early contributions to the cause of advancing medical science in India. In addition, the Government of Maharashtra has established a fellowship in her name for young women working on women's health. A crater on Venus has been named in her honour. The 34.3 km-diameter crater on Venus named 'Joshee' lies at latitude 5.5° N and longitude 288.8° E.

On 31 March 2018, Google honored her with a Google Doodle to mark her 153rd birth anniversary.

Anandi Gopal, an Indian biographical film on her life in Marathi by Sameer Vidwans released in 2019. It stars Bhagyashree Milind in the titular role, Lalit Prabhakar as her husband - Gopalrao Joshi and Yogesh Soman as her father - Ganpatrao Amriteshwar Joshi. In 2017, a Gujarati-language play titled Dr. Anandibai Joshi, directed by Manoj Shah,  premiered at the National Centre for the Performing Arts.

References

Bibliography
 

 Kosambi, Meera, "Caste and Outcast (review)". Journal of Colonialism and Colonial History – Volume 4, Number 1, Spring 2003, The Johns Hopkins University Press
 Anandibai Joshi: India’s first woman doctor (1865–1887)
 Between the Lines, an 18-minute English documentary on the life of Anandi Joshi
 Madhukar Vasudev Dhond, "Jalyatil Chandra" (Marathi) (Rajhans Prakashan, 11993)
 Documents at the Drexel University College of Medicine Archives and Special Collections on Women in Medicine and referencing Anandi Gopal Joshi

External links 

Anandibai Joshee materials in the South Asian American Digital Archive (SAADA)
A Marathi movie on Anandi Gopal https://www.imdb.com/title/tt8621438/

1865 births
1887 deaths
Marathi people
Indian women medical doctors
American Hindus
People from Thane district
Drexel University alumni
Scientists from Pune
19th-century Indian medical doctors
Medical doctors from Maharashtra
19th-century Indian women scientists
Women physicians from India
Women scientists from Maharashtra
Woman's Medical College of Pennsylvania alumni
19th-century women physicians
Tuberculosis deaths in India